The Ministry of Truth is a fictional government ministry from George Orwell's novel Nineteen Eighty-Four. 

The Ministry of Truth may also refer to:

 The Ministry of Truth (Lynskey book), a 2019 history of Orwell’s novel 
 The Ministry of Truth (Kracht book), a 2006 book of photographs from North Korea's capital
 "Ministry of Truth", a satirical name for Ukraine’s Ministry of Information Policy
 "Ministry of Truth", a satirical name for the United States Department of Homeland Security's Disinformation Governance Board

See also
 Ministry of Love (disambiguation)